Francis Thuita Kimemia (born 27 October 1957) is a Kenyan politician and the former governor for Nyandarua county August 2017 - August 2022.

Education 
Kimemia was born in Gituamba Village, Githerioni, Lari Constituency, Kiambu County, Kenya to Joseph Kimemia Migwi and Maria Nunga Kimemia. He attended HGM Uplands Primary School, Nyandarua High School, and Kagumo High School. He holds a BA in Political Science from the University of Nairobi, a BA in Public Administration from Moi University, and a Master's Degree in Business Administration from Eastern Southern African Management Institute.

Career 
He ran for governor of Nyandarua and served as secretary to the Cabinet of Kenya. He served the Ministry of State for Provincial Administration and Internal Security of Kenya in various roles from 1 January 2002 to 1 January 2012. He also held various roles in the Ministry of State for Education from 1 July 1996 to 1 January 2002.

Family
He is married to Ann Wangui Thuita. They have four children, Abraham Kimemia Thuita, Sarah Mariah Nunga Thuita, David Wanjohi Thuita and Consolata Njeri Thuita.

Potential misinformation on social media platforms. 
A false statement that purported to be by Nyandarua Governor Francis Kimemia was circulating on social media platforms that he was congratulating the United Democratic Alliance (UDA) Party candidate, Francis Muraya, for winning the Rurii ward by-election in Nyandarua County. The statement which further blames the party’s Leader of Majority in the National Assembly, Amos Kimunya, for “being aloof and disinterested with the happenings of Kipipiri and Nyandarua County at large” was flagged as fake  by PesaCheck which is East Africa’s first public finance fact-checking initiative in collaboration with Code for Africa-the continent’s largest civic technology and data journalism accelerator.

References
 

Living people
1957 births
Kenyan politicians